Moosa Panhwar is a village situated in the Dalipota Talka Bhiria of Naushahro Feroze District in Sindh, Pakistan.

Its in the western Side of Mithyani about 8.6 kilometers away while TharuShah city is located its eastern side about 12.4 kilometers away and Indus River is situated its northern side about 14 kilometer.  Naushahro Feroze District is its southern side about 15.5 kilometers away.

The village has facilities like natural gas connection to each home and electricity/power.

Bahadur Shah Zafar Panhwar

Imran Panhwar

References

 http://www.maplandia.com/pakistan/sind/nawab-shah/musa-panhwar/
 http://wikimapia.org/28009037/Moosa-Panhwar-Goth
 http://www.schoolinglog.com/school/Government-Boys-Primary-School-MOOSA-PANHWAR-Bhirya_106051.html

Villages in Pakistan
Naushahro Feroze District